KYDN (95.3 FM) is a radio station licensed to Monte Vista, Colorado, United States.  The station is currently owned by San Luis Valley Broadcasting.

History
The station was assigned the call letters KSLV-FM on 1984-06-15. On 2008-09-29, the station changed its call sign to the current KYDN.

References

External links

YDN
Country radio stations in the United States